The Muota is a river in the Swiss canton of Schwyz and a tributary of Lake Lucerne.

The Muota rises on the Ruosalp, an alp to the north of the Glatten on the border between the cantons of Schwyz and Uri. Initially, it flows in a northerly direction through the tiny Bisistal before turning west to the villages of Muotathal and Ried.

Beyond Ried, the river flows through a narrow defile between the Gibelhorn and Stooshorn, passing under the Stoosbahn funicular that serves the mountain resort of Stoos, as it does so. After leaving this canyon, the river turns north to reach the village of Ibach in the municipality of Schwyz. At Ibach the river turns west again, then shortly afterwards passes under the A4 motorway and the Gotthard railway line before receiving the Seeweren, which is the outfall stream of Lake Lauerz. Here it flows south-west to enter Lake Lucerne on the west side of the town of Brunnen in the municipality of Ingenbohl.

References

External links

Rivers of the canton of Schwyz
Rivers of Switzerland